Dingnan Jiedushi, also known as Xiasui Jiedushi, was a jiedushi created in 787 by the Tang dynasty that lasted until the early Northern Song dynasty, when its ruler Li Yuanhao proclaimed himself emperor and established the Western Xia dynasty. It was headquartered in modern Yulin, Shaanxi. Its rulers were of Tangut ethnicity starting from Li Sigong (Tuoba Sigong), and they effectively ruled the circuit in de facto independence despite its nominal submission to the central Chinese dynasties. Attempts by the Later Tang and Song dynasty to dislodge the family from its rule of Dingnan Jiedushi were unsuccessful, and the region eventually became the independent dynasty of Western Xia.

Pre-de facto independent Dingnan Jiedushi
 Han Tan (787-798)
 Han Quanyi (798-805)
 Yang Huilin (805-806)
 Li Yuan (806-811)
 Zhang Xu (811-813)
 Tian Jin (813-819)
 Li Ting (819-820)
 Li You (820-824)
 Fu Liangbi (824-828)
 Li Huan (828-830)
 Dong Zhongzhi (830-832)
 Li Changyan (832-836)
 Liu Yuan (836-838)
 Li E (844)
 Mi Ji (844-846)
 Li Ye (847-849)
 Cui Mou (849-851)
 Li Fu (851-854)
 Zheng Zhu (854-857)
 Tian Zaibin (857-862)
 Li Yanyuan (865-869)
 Hu Mou (869-874)
 Li Xuanli (874-879)
 Zhuge Shuang (880-881)

Rulers of Dingnan Circuit until Western Xia's founding 

 Li Sigong (~881–~886)
 Li Sijian (~886–908)
 Li Yichang (908–909/910)
 Li Renfu (909/910–933)
 Li Yichao (933–935)
 Li Yixing (935–967)
 Li Kerui (967–978)
 Li Jiyun (978–980)
 Li Jipeng (also known as Zhao Baozhong) (980–982, 988–994)
 Li Jiqian (also known as Zhao Baoji) (998–1004)
 Li Deming (1004–1031)
 Li Yuanhao (1031–1038, declaration of independent Western Xia state)

References 
 New Book of Tang, vol. 221, part 1.
 Old History of the Five Dynasties, vol. 132.
 New History of the Five Dynasties, vol. 40.
 History of Liao, vol. 115.
 History of Song, vols. 485, 486.
 History of Jin, vol. 134.

External links
History/Song - Chinaknowledge

States and territories established in the 780s
States and territories disestablished in 1038
8th-century establishments in China
11th-century disestablishments in China

1030s disestablishments in Asia